The White River Mess Hall and Dormitory is the only remaining Civilian Conservation Corps camp structure remaining in Mount Rainier National Park. The wood-framed building was built in 1933, and comprising , originally containing a kitchen dining room, living room, two bathrooms, a bedroom and a bunkroom, as well as a service porch. The building no longer serves as a residence and is used for storage. It is located at the White River entrance to the park, part of a complex of service buildings.

The mess hall was listed on the National Register of Historic Places on March 13, 1991. It is included in the White River Entrance Historic District. It is part of the Mount Rainier National Historic Landmark District, which encompasses the entire park and which recognizes the park's inventory of Park Service-designed rustic architecture.

References

Government buildings completed in 1933
National Park Service rustic in Washington (state)
Park buildings and structures on the National Register of Historic Places in Washington (state)
Buildings and structures in Pierce County, Washington
Civilian Conservation Corps in Washington (state)
Buildings and structures in Mount Rainier National Park
National Register of Historic Places in Mount Rainier National Park
1933 establishments in Washington (state)